William H. Meyer (April 14, 1847 – August 22, 1923) was the third Lieutenant Governor of Colorado, serving from 1883 to 1885 under James Benton Grant.

References

Lieutenant Governors of Colorado
1847 births
1923 deaths
Colorado Republicans